is a Japanese manga artist best known for his work, Muhyo and Roji's Bureau of Supernatural Investigation. He is the former assistant of Takeshi Obata. Born and raised in Hachioji, Tokyo.

Bibliography 
 (2004) ; English translation: Muhyo and Roji's Bureau of Supernatural Investigation (2007)
 (2009) 
 (2013-2014) 
 (2014) 
 (2016)

External links

References 

1976 births
Manga artists from Tokyo
People from Hachiōji, Tokyo
Living people